The 1991 Senior League World Series took place from August 11–17 in Kissimmee, Florida, United States. Pingtung, Taiwan defeated Pearl City, Hawaii twice in the championship game. It was Taiwan's fourth straight championship.

Teams

Results

Winner's Bracket

Loser's Bracket

Placement Bracket

Elimination Round

References

Senior League World Series
Senior League World Series
1991 in sports in Florida